Karl Wolfe (January 25, 1903 - November 19, 1984) was an American portrait painter and stained glass, mosaic and terracotta artist from the state of Mississippi. He did over 1,000 paintings, including 800 portraits.

Life
Wolfe was born on January 25, 1903, in Brookhaven, Mississippi. He grew up in Columbia, Mississippi, and he graduated from the Chicago Academy of Fine Arts.

Wolfe was a portrait painter, stained glass, mosaic and terracotta artist in Jackson, Mississippi, for five decades. He did over 1,000 paintings, including 800 portraits. His portraits depicted Mississippi governors, justices of the Mississippi Supreme Court, and even presidents; for example, his portrait President Andrew Jackson was installed in the Jackson City Hall. Wolfe co-designed a bronze sculpture for the Mitchell Memorial Library at Mississippi State University. Wolfe co-founded the Mississippi Art Colony in Way, Mississippi, in 1948, and he taught art at Millsaps College.

Wolfe married Mildred Nungester, also a painter, and they had a son, Michael, and a daughter, Elizabeth. He died on November 19, 1984, in Jackson, Mississippi, at age 80, and he was buried in the Lakewood Memorial Park.

Works

References

1903 births
1984 deaths
People from Brookhaven, Mississippi
Artists from Jackson, Mississippi
School of the Art Institute of Chicago alumni
American male painters
American portrait painters
American stained glass artists and manufacturers
Millsaps College faculty
Mosaic artists
Painters from Mississippi
20th-century American painters
20th-century American male artists